Year 1053 (MLIII) was a common year starting on Friday (link will display the full calendar) of the Julian calendar.

Events 
 By place 

 Byzantine Empire 
 End of the Pecheneg Revolt: Emperor Constantine IX Monomachos makes peace with the Pechenegs. However, Pecheneg raids do not cease; they not only damage the economy by plundering, but Constantine is also forced to buy protection or peace from them by gifts, land grants, privileges and titles.

 Europe 
 June 18 – Battle of Civitate: Norman horsemen (3,000 men), led by Humphrey of Hauteville, count of Apulia and Calabria, rout the combined forces under Pope Leo IX, in Southern Italy. The Normans destroy the allied Papal army and capture Leo, who is imprisoned (as a hostage for 8 months) in Benevento.
 December – Conrad I, duke of Bavaria, is summoned to a Christmas court at Merseburg, and deposed by Emperor Henry III. He flees to King Andrew I in Hungary, and joins a coalition with the rebellious Welf III, duke of Carinthia. Henry's 4-year-old son Henry becomes the new duke of Bavaria.

 England 
 April – Harold Godwinson succeeds his father Godwin as earl of Wessex. He invites the exiled Edward the Exile, son of Edmund II, to return in the hope that he can claim the English throne from King Edward the Confessor.

 By topic 

 Religion 
 Jōchō sculpts Amida Buddha for the Byōdō-in Temple during the Heian Period (approximate date).

Births 
 July 7 – Shirakawa, emperor of Japan (d. 1129)
 Berenguer Ramon II, count of Barcelona (approximate date)
 Guibert of Nogent, French historian and theologian (d. 1124)
 Hugh of Châteauneuf, bishop of Grenoble (d. 1132)
 Iorwerth ap Bleddyn, prince of Powys (d. 1111)
 Maria of Alania, Byzantine empress (d. 1118)
 Ramon Berenguer II, count of Barcelona (or 1054)
 Solomon (or Salomon), king of Hungary (d. 1087) 
 Toba Sōjō, Japanese artist-monk (d. 1140)
 Vladimir II, Grand Prince of Kiev (d. 1125)

Deaths 
 March 25 – Procopius of Sázava, Czech hermit
 April 15 – Godwin of Wessex, English nobleman 
 October 25 – Enguerrand II, count of Ponthieu
 November 7 – Lazaros, Byzantine monk and stylite
 Abu'l-Fath an-Nasir ad-Dailami, imam of Yemen
 Chananel ben Chushiel, Tunisian Jewish rabbi (b. 990)
 Cormac O'Ruadrach, Irish priest and archdeacon
 Liu Yong, Chinese poet of the Song Dynasty (b. 987)
 Murchadh Ua Beolláin, Irish priest and archdeacon
 Rhys ap Rhydderch, co-ruler of Morgannwg
 Wulfsige (or Wulsy), bishop of Lichfield

References